Eugene D. Lujan was a Justice of the New Mexico Supreme Court from 1945 to 1959.

Life 

He was born in Mora, New Mexico on April 25, 1887. He received both a bachelor's and master's degree in law in Washington D.C. Prior to being elected to the New Mexico Supreme Court, he was a District Attorney at the Second Judicial District in Albuquerque and then a judge at the Seventh District in Socorro. Lujan was elected to the New Mexico Supreme Court in 1945 and retired in 1959. He died on January 10, 1980.

References

1887 births
1980 deaths
Justices of the New Mexico Supreme Court
20th-century American judges
People from Mora, New Mexico
Chief Justices of the New Mexico Supreme Court
New Mexico Democrats